The Marine Ecology Progress Series is a peer-reviewed scientific journal that covers all aspects of marine ecology.

History 
The journal was founded by Otto Kinne. Its original concept was based on Marine Ecology, also once edited by Kinne and published by John Wiley & Sons.

Abstracting and indexing 
The Marine Ecology Progress Series is indexed and abstracted in Biological Abstracts, Scopus, and the Science Citation Index.

References

External links 

Publications established in 1979
English-language journals
Ecology journals